This is a list of the first minority male lawyer(s) and judge(s) in Virginia. It includes the year in which the men were admitted to practice law (in parentheses). Also included are men who achieved other distinctions such becoming the first in their state to graduate from law school or become a political figure.

Firsts in Virginia's history

Lawyer 

 First African American: Wathal G. Wynn (1871)

Law Clerk 

 First African American male to clerk for the Supreme Court of Virginia: Jerrauld Jones (1980)

State judges 

First African American male (elected): Daniel M. Norton in 1866 
First African American male (actively serve): James A. Fields in 1879 
First African American male (since Reconstruction Era): Willard Douglas (1949) in 1974 
First African American male (Virginia Supreme Court): John Charles Thomas (1975) in 1983 
First African American male (Virginia Court of Appeals): James W. Benton in 1984
First Native American (Cherokee) male: Charles Riley Cloud in 1986
 First African American male (Chief Justice; Virginia Supreme Court): Leroy R. Hassell Sr. (1980) in 2003 
 First Asian American male (Vietnamese descent): John M. Tran (1984) in 2013
 First openly gay male: Tracy Thorne-Begland in 2013
 First Indian American male: Rupen Shah in 2017

Federal judges 
 First African American male: James R. Spencer (1974) in 1986  
 First African American male (U.S. Court of Appeals for the Fourth Circuit): Roger Gregory (1978) in 2000 
 First African American male (Chief Justice; U.S. Court of Appeals for the Fourth Circuit): Roger Gregory (1978) in 2016

Attorney General of Virginia 

 First Latino American male: Jason Miyares in 2022

Assistant United States Attorney 

 First African American male (Eastern District of Virginia): William T. Mason, Jr.

Virginia State Bar 

 First Jewish American male: Michael A. Glasser in 2014

Firsts in local history 
 James Ghee (c. 1970s): First African American male lawyer in Farmville, Cumberland County and Prince Edward County, Virginia
 Daniel T. Lopez: First Latino American male judge in Arlington County, Virginia (2019)
 Gregory Swanson: First African American male admitted to the University of Virginia School of Law (1950)
 John Merchant: First African American male to graduate from the University of Virginia School of Law (1958)
 Larry S. Gibson (1967): First African American male to serve as a law professor for the University of Virginia School of Law (1972)
 Marcus Doyle Williams: First African American male judge in Fairfax County, Virginia (1987)
 Thomas Calhoun "T.C." Walker: First African American male lawyer in Gloucester County, Virginia
 Garland P. Faison: First African American male to serve as a Justice of the Peace in Greensville County, Virginia
 Wilford Taylor, Jr.: First African American male judge in Hampton, Virginia
 R.G.L. Paige: Reputed to be the first African American male lawyer in Norfolk, Virginia
Lester V. Moore: First African American male judge in Norfolk, Virginia (c. 1975)
Carlos Flores Laboy: First Latino American male judge in Prince William County, Virginia (2020)
T.D. Taylor (c. 1969): First African American male lawyer in Warsaw, Richmond County, Virginia
Onzlee Ware: First African American male to serve as a Judge of the Roanoke Circuit Court (2020)

 Kevin Duffan: First African American male to serve as a circuit judge in Virginia Beach, Virginia (2020)
 James A. Fields: First African American male lawyer and judicial officer in Warwick County, Virginia
 Albert Durant Sr.: First African American male to serve as a Justice of the Peace and magistrate in Williamsburg, Virginia [Williamsburg-James City County, Virginia]
William Stone: First African American male judge in Williamsburg-James City County, Virginia
A. Benjamin Spencer: First African American male to serve as the Dean of the College of William & Mary (2020)

See also 

 List of first minority male lawyers and judges in the United States

Other topics of interest 

 List of first women lawyers and judges in the United States
 List of first women lawyers and judges in Virginia

References 

 
Minority, Virginia, first
Minority, Virginia, first
Legal history of Virginia
Lists of people from Virginia
Virginia lawyers